Julius van den Berg (born 23 October 1996 in Purmerend) is a Dutch professional road racing cyclist, who currently rides for UCI WorldTeam .

In October 2020, he was named in the startlist for the 2020 Vuelta a España.

Major results

2014
 1st  Overall Coupe du Président de la Ville de Grudziądz
1st Stage 3
 1st Stage 2b Internationale Niedersachsen-Rundfahrt der Junioren
 2nd Road race, National Junior Road Championships
 2nd Overall Sint–Martinusprijs Kontich
 3rd Trofeo Comune di Vertova
2016
 5th Ronde van Noord-Holland
2017
 1st  Time trial, National Under-23 Road Championships
 4th Overall Olympia's Tour
 6th Ronde van Noord-Holland
 10th Slag om Norg
2018
 1st  Road race, National Under-23 Road Championships
 1st Ronde van Noord-Holland
 1st Midden–Brabant Poort Omloop
 2nd Paris–Roubaix Espoirs
 4th Overall Tour de Normandie
1st  Young rider classification
1st Stage 5
 7th Overall Tour de Bretagne
1st Stage 6
2021
 1st Stage 7 Tour de Pologne
 5th Time trial, National Road Championships
2022
 Vuelta a España
Held  after Stages 2—3

Grand Tour general classification results timeline

References

External links

1996 births
Living people
Dutch male cyclists
People from Purmerend
European Games competitors for the Netherlands
Cyclists at the 2019 European Games
Cyclists from North Holland
21st-century Dutch people